Gonçalo Filipe Oliveira Silva (born 4 June 1991) is a Portuguese professional footballer who plays for S.C. Farense as a central defender.

Club career
Born in Barreiro, Setúbal District, Silva spent his formative years with hometown side F.C. Barreirense before joining Vitória S.C. in 2010. He spent the next two seasons out on loan to A.D. Lousada (third division) and Atlético Clube de Portugal (second).

Silva terminated his contract with the club from Guimarães alleging unpaid wages, and signed a four-year contract with local rivals S.C. Braga on 9 July 2012. He played exclusively for the reserve team in the second tier, and scored a first career goal on 27 April 2014 in a 4–2 home win against C.S. Marítimo B; he was an unused substitute in three Primeira Liga games for the main squad.

In the summer of 2015, Silva transferred to C.F. Os Belenenses of the top flight, his debut in the competition taking place on 26 October in a 1–0 home victory over C.F. União where he featured ten minutes. He extended his contract by one year in March 2017 to last until 2020, eventually being named captain.

Silva moved abroad for the first time in July 2021, joining Radomiak Radom from Poland on a two-year deal. He returned to his homeland on 16 June 2022, with second-tier S.C. Farense.

International career
Silva won his only cap for Portugal at under-21 level on 14 August 2012, playing the second half of the 2–1 friendly defeat of Macedonia held in Ponte de Sor.

References

External links

1991 births
Living people
Sportspeople from Barreiro, Portugal
Portuguese footballers
Association football defenders
Primeira Liga players
Liga Portugal 2 players
Segunda Divisão players
F.C. Barreirense players
Vitória S.C. players
A.D. Lousada players
Atlético Clube de Portugal players
S.C. Braga B players
S.C. Braga players
C.F. Os Belenenses players
Belenenses SAD players
S.C. Farense players
Ekstraklasa players
Radomiak Radom players
Portugal under-21 international footballers
Portuguese expatriate footballers
Expatriate footballers in Poland
Portuguese expatriate sportspeople in Poland